Vice Admiral Sir George David Archibald Gregory  & Bar (8 October 1909 – 21 March 1975) was a Royal Navy officer who became Flag Officer, Scotland and Northern Ireland.

Naval career
Gregory became a sub-lieutenant in the Royal Navy in 1930. In a single action in September 1940 HMS Sturgeon torpedoed an enemy transport ship with the loss of 4,000 German troops. He was appointed Commodore-in-Charge, Hong Kong from March 1957 to April 1960. He was next appointed Admiral-Superintendent, Devonport in 1960, and Flag Officer, Scotland and Northern Ireland in 1964 before retiring in 1966.

References

1909 births
1975 deaths
Royal Navy vice admirals
Knights Commander of the Order of the British Empire
Companions of the Order of the Bath
Companions of the Distinguished Service Order
Royal Navy submarine commanders
Military personnel from Perth, Scotland